The women's 1000 metres race of the 2015–16 ISU Speed Skating World Cup 3, arranged in Eisstadion Inzell, in Inzell, Germany, was held on 5 December 2015.

Brittany Bowe of the United States won the race, while compatriot Heather Richardson-Bergsma came second, and Lee Sang-hwa of South Korea came third. Erina Kamiya of Japan won the Division B race.

Results
The race took place on Saturday, 5 December, with Division B scheduled in the morning session, at 10:35, and Division A scheduled in the afternoon session, at 14:30.

Division A

Division B

References

Women 1000
3